Mutato Muzika is an American music production company established and owned by Devo co-founder and lead singer Mark Mothersbaugh in 1989. The name is a portmanteau of the words mutant and potato, a nod to Mothersbaugh's longstanding fascination with mutants and mutation, and to Devo fans, whom the band dubbed "spuds," early on.

While Devo members Mark Mothersbaugh, Gerald Casale and Bob Mothersbaugh, with drummer Josh Freese, often meet, rehearse and confer in its West Hollywood, California studio facilities, Mutato Muzika is a full-service music production company. Until his death in 2014, Bob Casale served as a producer/engineer there.

Mutato Muzika has produced music for many films, including Rushmore, The Royal Tenenbaums, The Life Aquatic with Steve Zissou, Confessions of a Teenage Drama Queen, 13, Lords of Dogtown, Nick & Norah's Infinite Playlist, Cloudy with a Chance of Meatballs, and Catfish. Television music includes Rugrats, Shaggy & Scooby-Doo Get a Clue!, Pee-wee's Playhouse, Big Love, Eureka,  Shameless, Enlightened and Regular Show. Mutato Muzika-produced video game scores include Crash Bandicoot and The Sims. Mutato Muzika also provides music for commercials, including spots for Apple's PC vs. Mac, Martini & Rossi's George Clooney/Giorgio, Apartments.com, and others.

The company is housed in a round bright green building at 8760 West Sunset Boulevard. The building is rumored to have been designed by Brazilian architect Oscar Niemeyer (although no architect's name is listed on the building permit), modeling the exterior after The Forum in Inglewood, California, former home of the NBA's Los Angeles Lakers and NHL's Los Angeles Kings. Previously known as "The Beauty Pavilion", it was built in 1967 for plastic surgeon Dr. Richard Alan Franklyn, who wanted the roof to have skylights in order to illuminate the operating room in the center of the structure. The building was painted green after Mothersbaugh took ownership of it.

Personnel
Mark Mothersbaugh – composer, songwriter, vocalist, founder
Andrea Feyler – studio manager
Albert Fox – associate composer
John Enroth –Associate composer
Wataru Hokoyama - orchestrator + conductor
Ethan Obbema - media assistant
Hana Blaquera – art archivist / collections manager
Jennifer Shipman - Artist Rep/Project Manager
Arthur Sadler – office coordinator

Productions

Films
Mutato Muzika has received credit for recordings in the following films:

The Lego Ninjago Movie
The Lego Movie
Pee-wee's Big Holiday
Hotel Transylvania 2
Vacation
Pitch Perfect 2
22 Jump Street
Hotel Transylvania
Cloudy with a Chance of Meatballs 2
Safe
What to Expect When You're Expecting
21 Jump Street
Moonrise Kingdom

The Royal Tenenbaums
Rugrats in Paris: The Movie
The Adventures of Rocky and Bullwinkle
Drop Dead Gorgeous
Mystery Men
It's the Rage
Rushmore
200 Cigarettes
Dead Man on Campus
The Rugrats Movie
Best Men
Sorority Boys
Bottle Rocket
The Last Supper

Cloudy with a Chance of Meatballs
Happy Gilmore
Four Rooms
Thirteen
The New Age
The Life Aquatic with Steve Zissou
The Big Squeeze
Breaking Up
Flesh Suitcase
Down on the Waterfront
It's Pat
Welcome to Collinwood
Catfish
Saving Private Perez
Born to Be Wild
Thor: Ragnarok
The Croods: A New Age
Cocaine Bear

Television
Mutato Muzika has received credit for recordings in the following television programs:

The Carrie Diaries
House of Lies
Enlightened
Clifford the Big Red Dog
Dawson's Creek
Can Of Worms
The Mr. Potato Head Show
Rugrats
Working
Quicksilver Highway
Principal Takes a Holiday
Last Rites
Fired Up
Life's Work
Strange Luck
Liquid Television
Pee-wee's Playhouse

Santo Bugito
Bakersfield P.D.
Sliders
Future Quest
A.J.'s Time Travelers
Beakman's World
Adventures in Wonderland
If Not for You
Too Something
Medicine Ball
Street Match
Second Chances
Edith Ann
South Beach
Mann & Machine
Davis Rules
Will Vinton Easter Special

Great Scott!
Felix the Cat
Hotel Malibu
Greg the Bunny
Muscle
McDonald's
Hidden Hills
The Mind of the Married Man
Stinky Pierre
You Animal
MD's
Eureka
Shaggy & Scooby-Doo Get a Clue!
Shameless
Blue Mountain State
Regular Show
Disenchantment
Summer Camp Island
Close Enough
Rugrats (2021 revival)

Video games
Interstate '82 - Josh Mancell
The Sims 2 - Mark Mothersbaugh
Crash Bandicoot - Josh Mancell
Crash Bandicoot 2: Cortex Strikes Back - Josh Mancell
Crash Bandicoot 3: Warped - Josh Mancell
Crash Team Racing - Josh Mancell
Jak and Daxter: The Precursor Legacy - Josh Mancell
Jak II - Josh Mancell
Jak 3 - Josh Mancell
Boom Blox - Mark Mothersbaugh, Albert Fox, John Enroth and Silas Hite
MySims
MySims Kingdom
MySims Racing
MySims Agents
The Lego Movie Videogame - Mark Mothersbaugh

References

External links
 Official website
 Studio tour video from 2010 with Keyboard magazine, showing vintage instruments and the building's interior

1989 establishments in California
Companies based in Los Angeles
Mass media companies established in 1989
Devo
Music production companies
American electronic music groups
Video game composers